Haplochromis howesi is a species of cichlid endemic to Lake Victoria.  This species can reach a length of  SL. The specific name honours the British taxonomist Gordon J. Howes (1938-2013) of the British Museum (Natural History).

References

howesi
Fish described in 1992
Fish of Lake Victoria
Taxonomy articles created by Polbot